USS Brown may refer to the following ships of the United States Navy:

 , a minesweeping tugboat acquired in 1917 and sunk in 1920

United States Navy ship names